Adult Contemporary is a chart published by Billboard ranking the top-performing songs in the United States in the adult contemporary music (AC) market.  First published in 1961, the listing was compiled until 1965 by simply extracting from the magazine's all-genre chart, the Hot 100, those songs which were deemed of an appropriate style and ranking them according to their placings on the Hot 100.  In 1964, 12 different songs topped the chart in 52 issues of the magazine. The chart was published under the title Middle-Road Singles through the issue of Billboard dated April 25, Pop-Standard Singles through the issue dated October 17, and Middle-Road Singles again for the remainder of the year.

The only artist to achieve more than one number one in 1964 was Dean Martin, who spent eight weeks in the top spot with "Everybody Loves Somebody" and one with "The Door Is Still Open to My Heart".  Martin tied for the highest total number of weeks spent at number one with Louis Armstrong, who had an unbroken run of nine weeks at number one with "Hello, Dolly!", the longest uninterrupted run in the top spot during 1964.  Armstrong's song was the title song of the stage musical of the same name, which had opened on Broadway earlier in the year.   A second song from a newly-opened musical to top the chart was "People" from Funny Girl, which gave Barbra Streisand the first Billboard chart-topper of one of the most successful careers in popular music history.

Four of the year's Middle-Road/Pop-Standard chart-toppers also reached number one on the magazine's all-genre chart, the Hot 100, including both the first and last number ones of the year, "There! I've Said It Again" by Bobby Vinton and "Ringo" by actor-singer Lorne Greene.  Armstrong's "Hello, Dolly!" and Martin's "Everybody Loves Somebody" also topped both charts.  Two of the year's number ones were Grammy Award winners.   Al Hirt's "Java" won the award for Best Performance by an Orchestra or Instrumentalist with Orchestra at the 1964 ceremony, and the following year "Hello, Dolly!" won the award for Song of the Year.

Chart history

References

See also
1964 in music
List of artists who reached number one on the U.S. Adult Contemporary chart

1964
1964 record charts